Bernard Raymond Fink (25 May 1914 – 30 October 2000) was a British physician.
Fink was born in London, brought up in Antwerp, Belgium, and emigrated to the United States in 1950. He was bestowed ASA  Excellence in Research Award in 1987. He was the secretary of the International Association for the Study of Pain and the President of the Anesthesia History Association. He first explained the Fink Effect in his 1955 paper "Diffusion anoxia".
He went to the University of London at 16. He served as a medical officer during World War II in South Africa. He has two daughters (Jean Moore and Susan Myers), two sisters, one brother and five grandchildren.

References

1914 births
2000 deaths
Alumni of the University of London
British anaesthetists
British emigrants to the United States
Medical doctors from London
British expatriates in Belgium